Nothing Left to Fear is a 2013 American supernatural horror film directed by Anthony Leonardi III. The film received some coverage due to its association with the Guns N' Roses band member Slash, as this marked the first film produced through his production company Slasher Films. The film was first released on September 26, 2013, in Russia and was released later the same year in the United States.

The film was inspired by the urban legends surrounding Stull, Kansas, which is rumored to be home to one of the "Seven Known Gateways to Hell".

Plot
Pastor Dan (James Tupper), his wife Wendy (Anne Heche), and their three children Rebecca (Rebekah Brandes), Mary (Jennifer Stone), and Christopher (Carter Cabassa), have just moved to the small town of Stull, Kansas, where Dan will serve as the new pastor. While traveling to the town, Rebecca sees a teenage boy killing a sheep and collecting the blood. Along the way Dan meets the farmer, Mason (Wayne Pére), and eventually the family moves into their new home, assisted by the town's old pastor, Pastor Kingsman (Clancy Brown) and parish members. Later that night, Rebecca has a nightmare.

The following day, Pastor Kingsman gives the family a cake that a parish member baked for them as a token of gratitude. Mary later decides to have a slice of the cake but chokes on a tooth baked into the snack. Meanwhile, Rebecca meets the same boy that she saw killing sheep, Noah (Ethan Peck), who takes her out to see the town. Their fun is interrupted when Mason comes to get Noah, telling him that Pastor Kingsman wants to see him. Rebecca returns home and finds that Mary is feeling ill. Meanwhile, Noah is told by Pastor Kingsman that he should do what is to be done because it is God's will. Noah begrudgingly says that since Mary has discovered the tooth in the cake, she is the chosen one. It turns out that the tooth in the cake is a form of lottery, and whoever comes across it first will be marked as selected.

The film then shifts to Wendy and her family making food for the upcoming Summer Festival, which will begin in a couple of days. The children go into town to do some sightseeing, where Rebecca ends up running into Noah. The two of them end up going on a date on the observation platform of the fire lookout tower in the forest surrounding the town and Rebecca notices a scar on Noah's hand, which he tries to hide. She then notices that a man is watching them from the bottom of the lookout tower.

The next day Rebecca and Mary meet Noah at the festival. He takes them to get some lemonade at a nearby stall, only for Mary's lemonade to end up being drugged with a poison. Mary gets violently ill and tries to go home but is kidnapped by Mason. She awakens to find herself tied to a post while Pastor Kingsman tells her that she was chosen according to God's will. He then opens the "Gateway to Hell", resulting in Mary becoming possessed by the Devil. He then takes her back to her family, telling them that she was sick. Noah unsuccessfully tries to confess to Rebecca what has happened, but is accidentally interrupted by Christopher. Upon returning home, Dan is called away by Pastor Kingman, who tells him that he is needed in the church. This ends up being a ruse, as Pastor Kingsman then drugs and imprisons him shortly after his arrival.

Meanwhile, in the house, Mary awakens completely possessed and vomits a black substance, frightening her family. Wendy sends the remaining two children to find their father. With Noah's help they get inside the church and discover Dan to be seemingly unconscious on the church floor. They help him up and begin to drive home. Back at home, Wendy finds Mary in the corner and is attacked by her. On the way, they see that every house has a mark on its door, an 'X' made out of blood. Frightened, Rebecca repeatedly asks Noah about the mark, but he refuses to answer her. The group arrive at the house, where Dan and Rebecca try to go inside to get Wendy and Mary. Noah grabs hold of Rebecca, telling her to stay outside, and that there's nothing she can do to help them. Dan proceeds inside to find Wendy dead and crumbling away on the couch. Dan stumbles back in fear, and sees Mary crawling towards him on the stairway. He runs out of the house screaming at Rebecca and Noah to start the car and drive away.

They do so and Dan stays behind to try to free Mary, who has followed him out to the front yard, only to meet the same fate as Wendy. Rebecca makes Noah stop the car and argues with him about what is going on. Christopher sees Mary is coming up behind them as Noah tries to explain what is happening to Rebecca. Noah states that the same thing happened to Noah and his family some years ago. Christopher, frightened, runs out of the car to a nearby house and frantically starts banging on the door asking for help. Noah then shoves Rebecca back into the car, leaving Christopher behind. Christopher finds a house and manages to get inside, but not before Mary grabs his leg and infects him. He begs the family for help, but the frightened father brings him back outside. Before Mary can get to him, Noah runs her over as Rebecca rescues Christopher. Noah parks the car in the middle of the street and leaves, begging Rebecca to leave if they see Mary. Soon the car looses power as Mary catches up to them. Noah returns and holds Rebeca back as Mary kills Christopher.

Noah then takes Rebecca to a gathering at and abandoned church with Mary arriving soon afterwards. Noah then cuts her wrist and uses her blood to destroy the Devil, killing Mary in the process, and close the Gateway to Hell. As she lays unconscious, the townsfolk gather around her as a light begins to emanate from the center. Some time later, another family is moving into the town as the. The new boy catches the attention of Rebecca, having taken Noah's place by killing a sheep before walking away.

Cast
 Anne Heche as Wendy
 James Tupper as Dan
 Ethan Peck as Noah
 Rebekah Brandes as Rebecca
 Carter Cabassa as Christopher
 Wayne Pére as Mason
 Jennifer Stone as Mary
 Clancy Brown as Pastor Kingsman
 Morgan Roberts as new boy

Production
Plans to film Nothing Left to Fear were first announced in 2010, when Slash announced his intent to launch his production company Slasher Films with Nothing Left to Fear as its flagship film. Thomas Haden Church was initially named as one of the stars of the film, but his name was later removed from the production for unspecified reasons. Clancy Brown and Ethan Peck were added to the cast in early 2012, joining Anne Heche and James Tupper. Filming began on May 14, 2012 in Covington, Louisiana and film rights for Nothing Left to Fear were purchased by Anchor Bay.

Release 
The film was first released on September 26, 2013 in Russia and received a limited theatrical release on October 4 of the same year in the United States, alongside a video on demand release, before being released on DVD and Blu-ray Disc the following Tuesday.

Soundtrack
An official soundtrack was released for Nothing Left to Fear on October 31, 2013, to coincide with the world release of the film.

The music was written and produced by Slash and Nicholas O'Toole. The soundtrack is mostly film scoring but includes two songs, one of which features vocals by Myles Kennedy. Prior to writing the score, Slash approached Leonardi with several musical styles and asked Leonardi to choose which style best fit the film. Of composing the soundtrack, Slash opined that he found it "nothing like if [he's] writing with a band in mind" and that writing music for a story and concept was "not constricted by songwriting" and was a "great departure for [him]".

Track list

Reception
Critical reception for Nothing Left to Fear has been overwhelmingly negative. The film holds a rating of 12 on Metacritic based upon reviews by 7 critics indicating "overwhelming dislike." Ratings on Rotten Tomatoes are also negative; the film holds a rating of 9% approval rating based on 11 reviews, with an average score of 3.21/10. 
Critics panned the film as "dull" and criticized it for its lack of scares. Los Angeles Times remarked that "director Anthony Leonardi III and writer Jonathan Mills have let not one scary moment on screen" and that actors Heche and Tupper should write apology notes to their fans. In their review, The Hollywood Reporter joked on the film's title, saying that the "title of this perfunctory horror film proves all too prophetic." Variety also gave a negative review and commented that the film "features fewer small-town scares than a rerun of Dawson’s Creek and more wooden acting than a marionette theater".

References

External links
 

2013 films
2013 horror films
2010s English-language films
2010s supernatural horror films
American supernatural horror films
Films about families
Films set in Kansas
Films shot in Louisiana
2010s American films